The Cayman Islands is a group of three islands in the Caribbean Sea. The first monthly publication on the islands was The Gospel of the Kingdom, a religious themed newspaper founded in 1945. In 1964, the newspaper Tradewinds began publication. This was joined by the rival Caymanian Weekly in 1965. This was followed by a second weekly publication, the Cayman Compass, which started in 1972. In 1974, the two weeklies merged to form the Caymanian Compass. This became a bi-weekly publication in 1976, appearing on Tuesdays and Fridays.

Other newspapers that have appeared on the islands are the Cayman Times (1979–1982), Caymanian Pilot (1984) and the New Cameranian (1990–1992).

The following newspapers feature Cayman Islands news:

Cayman Compass (available in a daily newspaper or on )
Cayman News Service (online newspaper on )
Cayman Observer, a weekly business-oriented newspaper
Cayman Islands Gazette, the official government publication
iNews Cayman (online newspaper on )
Real Cayman News (online newspaper on )

References

Cay
Mass media in the Cayman Islands